Roll Roll and Flee is Nikola Sarcević's second solo album.

Track listing 
"From Where I´m Standing"
"Soul For Sale"
"Let Me In"
"Love Is Trouble"
"Tybble Skyline"
"Roll Roll And Flee"
"The Law Of John T."
"Horse Bay Blues"
"Thin Air"
"Married"
"Don't Kill The Flame"

Lineup 
Nikola Sarcević: Lead and Backing Vocals, Acoustic and Electric guitar, Piano, Harmonica, Percussion
Henrik Wind: Electric and Acoustic guitars, Bass, Pianos and Organs, Mandolin, Banjo, Percussion and Backing Vocals
Fredrik Sandsten: Drums
Kristofer Åström: Backing Vocals
Branko Sarcevic: Acoustic guitar
Kalle Gustafsson Jerneholm: Percussion, Accordion, Harp
 Mattias Hellberg: Harmonica
Stefan Sporsén: Trumpet
Håkan Svensson: Pedal Steel
John Rönneklev: Percussion

External links
Page at BurningHeart.com

2006 albums